Sterling Tower is a twenty one storey  art deco skyscraper at 372 Bay Street at Richmond Street in Toronto, Ontario, Canada.

Overview
Designed by Chapman and Oxley, and completed in 1928, the building was the tallest in the city for one year, until the construction of the Royal York Hotel.  Henry Falk, a New York entrepreneur, was the builder responsible for Sterling Tower's construction along with local firm Yolles & Rotenberg.  The Sterling Tower was part of Toronto's late 1920s building boom.

Recognition
On 18 August 1976, Sterling Tower was adopted by the City Council of Toronto as an architectural/contextual Heritage Property.

References

External links
Sterling Towers at UrbanDB

Office buildings completed in 1928
Skyscrapers in Toronto
City of Toronto Heritage Properties
Art Deco skyscrapers
Art Deco architecture in Canada
Chapman and Oxley buildings
1928 establishments in Ontario
Skyscraper office buildings in Canada